Polyxenida is an order of millipedes readily distinguished by a unique body plan consisting of a soft, non-calcified body ornamented with tufts of bristles – traits that have inspired the common names "bristly millipedes" or "pincushion millipedes". There are at least 86 species in four families worldwide, and are the only living members of the subclass Penicillata.

Description 

Polyxenida differ from other millipedes in having a soft, non-calcified exoskeleton, unique tufts of bristles or setae, fewer legs (no more than 17 pairs), and an absence of copulatory appendages in males. Individuals are small, not exceeding 7 millimeters (0.28 inches). Adults in most species have 13 pairs of legs, but in one species (Lophoturus madecassus), they have only 11 pairs of legs, and in one genus (Phryssonotus), they have 17 pairs of legs, except for one species (Phryssonotus brevicapensis) in which they (along with those in one other species, Condexenus biramipalpus) have 15 pairs of legs. Millipedes in this order develop by hemianamorphosis.

Defense 

Bristly millipedes lack the chemical defenses and hard exoskeleton of other millipedes, and instead employ a unique defense mechanism: the distinctive barbed bristles can easily detach and become entangled in the limbs and mouth-parts of predatory insects, effectively immobilizing them.

Reproduction 

Male Polyxenidans lack the modified sperm-transferring appendages (gonopods) found in most other millipede groups. As a result, sperm transfer is indirect: males deposit a spermatophore that is subsequently picked up by females.

Many species reproduce asexually by way of parthenogenesis, wherein females lay eggs without mating and males are absent or rare.

Classification 

Polyxenida is the only living order of the subclass Penicillata, the basal subclass of millipedes. Penicillata is the sister group of all other living millipedes: the infraclasses Pentazonia and Helminthomorpha.

In 2003 the Polyxenida contained 159 valid species and/or subspecies, although at least eight new species have been described since 2010.

Superfamily Polyxenoidea Lucas, 1840
Hypogexenidae Schubart, 1947
Lophoproctidae Silvestri, 1897
Polyxenidae Lucas, 1840
Superfamily Synxenoidea Silvestri, 1923
Synxenidae Silvestri, 1923

Fossil history
The earliest representatives of Polyxenida are found in Lebanese amber from the Early Cretaceous period.
Some authors place the extinct orders Arthropleurida and Eoarthropleurida (each represented by a single genus) within the Penicillata as a sister group to Polyxenida.

References

External links 

 Photos of Polyxenida

 
Millipede orders
Taxa named by Karl Wilhelm Verhoeff